Believe Me Now may refer to:

"Believe Me Now", a song by the Electric Light Orchestra on the album Out of the Blue
"Believe Me Now", a song by Steven Curtis Chapman on the album All Things New